Eagle Butte is a summit in Ziebach County, South Dakota, in the United States.

Eagle Butte was so named on account of the area being a favourite hunting ground for eagles to be used for making war bonnets.

References

Landforms of Ziebach County, South Dakota
Mountains of South Dakota